Hoyos is a surname. Notable people with the surname include:

Albertoyos (born 1969), Spanish illustrator
Alexander, Count of Hoyos (1876–1937), Austro-Hungarian diplomat
Alfredo Castillero Hoyos, Panamanian political scientist
Ana Mercedes Hoyos (1942–2014), Columbian artist
Ángel Guillermo Hoyos (born 1963), Argentine footballer
Arturo de Hoyos (1925–2016), Mexican-American university professor 
Bernardo Francisco de Hoyos de Seña (1711–1735), Spanish Roman Catholic priest
Carlos Hoyos (born 1962), Colombian footballer
Carlos Mauro Hoyos (1939–1988), Colombian jurist and politician
Cristina Hoyos (born 1946), Spanish flamenco dancer
Darío Castrillón Hoyos (1929–2018), Colombian cardinal of the Catholic Church
Diana Hoyos (born 1985), Colombian actress and singer
Douglas Hoyos (born 1990), Austrian politician
Ernst Hoyos, German dressage trainer
Ernst Karl von Hoyos-Sprinzenstein (1830–1903), Austrian landowner and politician
Herbin Hoyos (1967–2021), Colombian journalist and broadcaster
Jorge Martínez de Hoyos (1920–1997), Mexican actor
Juan López de Hoyos (1511–1583), Spanish schoolmaster and author
Ladislas de Hoyos (1939–2011), French TV journalist
Lucas Hoyos (born 1989), Argentine footballer
Lucía Hoyos (born 1975), Spanish actress, presenter and model
Manuel León Hoyos (born 1989), Mexican chess Grandmaster
Maria Elena Milagro de Hoyos (1909–1931), Cuban-American tuberculosis victim
Mariano de Jesús Euse Hoyos (1845–1926), Colombian Roman Catholic priest
Miguel Ángel Hoyos (born 1981), Bolivian footballer
Ricardo Martínez de Hoyos (1918–2009), Mexican painter
Rodolfo Hoyos Jr. (1916–1983), Mexican-American film and television actor
Santiago Hoyos (born 1982), Argentine footballer
Terri Hoyos (born 1952), Mexican-American actress
Viviane Morales Hoyos (born 1962), Colombian politician

See also
Hoyos, municipality located in the province of Cáceres, Extremadura
Hoyos del Espino, municipality located in the province of Ávila, Castile and León
Hoyos del Collado, municipality located in the province of Ávila, Castile and León
Duke of Almodóvar del Río
House of Hoyos
Palais Hoyos
Rosenburg
Rundersburg Castle
Mayerling incident